Kanahia is a genus of flowering plants of the family Apocynaceae, first described as a genus in 1810. It is native to Africa and to the Arabian Peninsula.

Species
 Kanahia carlsbergiana D.V.Field, Friis & M.G.Gilbert - Bale Region of Ethiopia
 Kanahia delilii Kotschy ex Decne. - Mount Aquaro in Ethiopia
 Kanahia forskalii Decne. - Yemen
 Kanahia laniflora (Forssk.) R.Br. 1810 not G.Don 1837 nor K.Schum. 1895 - Arabia, Sudan, Ethiopia
 Kanahia monroi S.Moore - Zimbabwe

References

Apocynaceae genera
Asclepiadoideae